Kurista may refer to several places in Estonia:

Kurista, Jõgeva County, village in Jõgeva Parish, Jõgeva County
Kurista, Tartu County, village in Kastre Parish, Tartu County